The United Nations Administrative Tribunal (UNAT) was established by the United Nations General Assembly in 1950 to be the final arbiter over alleged non-observance of contracts of employment and other binding regulations of all staff working in the United Nations Secretariat.

As of 30 June 2009 the mandate of the United Nations Administrative Tribunal has ended.  The new internal justice system, United Nations Appeals Tribunal (UNAT) went into effect on 1 July 2009.  Please see Office of Administration of Justice for more information.

Rationale

Because the United Nations is not subject to the jurisdiction of any state, it has its own internal justice mechanisms for administering civil justice, such as in the domains of entitlements and benefits for staff, other contract issues, disciplinary proceedings, etc.  In order to ensure the independence of this organ, it is composed not by officials of the Organization, but by judges appointed by the Member States of the United Nations through the United Nations General Assembly, from which UNAT derives its mandate.

Other international administrative tribunals 

 Administrative Tribunal of the International Labour Organization
 World Bank administrative tribunal
 International Monetary Fund administrative tribunal 
 Administrative tribunal of the Council of Europe 
 EBRD administrative tribunal

References

United Nations legislation
United Nations General Assembly subsidiary organs
Labour courts
International administrative tribunals
United Nations courts and tribunals
Courts and tribunals established in 1950
Courts and tribunals disestablished in 2009